"Destroying Angel" is the second episode of the fourth series of Midsomer Murders and the fifteenth episode overall. It stars John Nettles as Detective Chief Inspector Tom Barnaby and Daniel Casey as Detective Sergeant Gavin Troy.

Plot 
The will of late hotelier Karl Wainright causes ructions amongst his staff, and soon a serial murderer begins hunting down the beneficiaries, dispatching them in increasingly gruesome and imaginative ways. Meanwhile, Barnaby and Troy discover the bizarre village tradition of exposing dark secrets - through cryptic Punch and Judy shows.

Murder methods 
Smothering
Arrow shot and dismemberment
Poisoning by the eponymous species of mushroom
Crushed by cabinet
Shotgun blast

External links
 

Midsomer Murders episodes
2001 British television episodes